Zadoc Benedict was a hat manufacturer who established the first hat factory on Main Street in Danbury, Connecticut in 1780. It had 3 employees, and made 18 hats weekly.

Legend holds that Benedict plugged a hole in his shoe with rabbit fur, and found that over time the fur turned into felt. He then supposedly developed a process of making hats from the fur of locally available animals, like rabbit and beaver.

References

American milliners
Year of birth missing
Year of death missing
18th-century American businesspeople
People from Danbury, Connecticut
18th-century American inventors
Inventors from Connecticut